This is a list of the champions and runners-up of the Wimbledon Championships Mixed Doubles tournament, first introduced to the championship in 1913. From 1915 to 1918, and from 1940 to 1945, no competition was held due to the two World Wars.

From 1888, the "All England" mixed doubles championship was held during the Northern Association Tournament (at Manchester or Liverpool).

Finalists

Amateur Era

Open Era

See also

Wimbledon other competitions
List of Wimbledon gentlemen's singles champions
List of Wimbledon gentlemen's doubles champions
List of Wimbledon ladies' singles champions
List of Wimbledon ladies' doubles champions

Grand Slam mixed doubles
List of Australian Open mixed doubles champions
List of French Open mixed doubles champions
List of US Open mixed doubles champions
List of Grand Slam mixed doubles champions

References

External links 
 Mixed doubles champions and runners-up at the official Championships Website

Mixed Doubles
Wimbledon
Wimbledon